Cassano Valcuvia is a comune (municipality) in the Province of Varese in the Italian region Lombardy, located about  northwest of Milan and about  northwest of Varese.

Cassano Valcuvia borders the following municipalities: Cuveglio, Duno, Ferrera di Varese, Grantola, Mesenzana, Rancio Valcuvia. The Italian tenor Aldo Bertocci lived in the town from 1974 until his death in 2004.

References

Cities and towns in Lombardy